Sexual characteristics are physical traits of an organism (typically of a sexually dimorphic organism) which are indicative of its biological sex. These include both primary sex characteristics and secondary sex characteristics.

Primary sexual characteristics are characteristics other than the gonads that are directly required for sexual reproduction.

Humans 

In humans, sex organs or primary sexual characteristics, which are those a person is born with, can be distinguished from secondary sex characteristics, which develop later in life, usually during puberty. The development of both is controlled by sex hormones produced by the body after the initial fetal stage where the presence or absence of the Y-chromosome and/or the SRY gene determine development.

Male primary sex characteristics are the penis and the scrotum. Female primary sex characteristics are the vagina, uterus, fallopian tubes, clitoris, cervix, and the ability to give birth.

Hormones that express sexual differentiation in humans include:
 estrogens
 progesterone
 androgens such as testosterone

Typical sexual characteristics 
The following table lists the typical sexual characteristics in humans (even though some of these can also appear in other animals as well):

Other organisms
In invertebrates and plants, hermaphrodites (which have both male and female reproductive organs either at the same time or during their life cycle) are common, and in many cases, the norm.

In other varieties of multicellular life (e.g. the fungi division, Basidiomycota) sexual characteristics can be much more complex, and may involve many more than two sexes. For details on the sexual characteristics of fungi, see: Hypha and Plasmogamy.

See also
 Mammalian gestation
 Reproduction
 Sex and gender distinction
 Sexual differentiation

References

Sexual anatomy